The Woodward News is a five-day daily newspaper based in Woodward, Oklahoma. The newspaper is distributed five mornings per week, Tuesday through Saturday. The newspaper is owned by Community Newspaper Holdings Inc. The newspaper is 50 cents daily and $1 for the Saturday/Sunday "Weekend Edition". It began publication in 1984.

References

Newspapers published in Oklahoma
Publications established in 1984